The Corus Chess Tournament 2002 was the 64th edition of the Corus Chess Tournament. It was held in Wijk aan Zee in January 2002 and was won by Evgeny Bareev.

2002 
{| class="wikitable" style="text-align: center;"
|+ 64th Corus Chess Tournament, group A, 11–27 January 2002, Wijk aan Zee, Cat. XVIII (2688)
! !! Player !! Rating !! 1 !! 2 !! 3 !! 4 !! 5 !! 6 !! 7 !! 8 !! 9 !! 10 !! 11 !! 12 !! 13 !! 14 !! Total !! TPR !! Place
|-
|-style="background:#ccffcc;"
| 1 || align=left| || 2707 ||  || ½ || ½ || ½ || 0 || 1 || 1 || ½ || ½ || 1 || 1 || ½ || 1 || 1 || 9 || 2827 || 1
|-
| 2 || align="left" | || 2671 || ½ ||  || 0 || 1 || 1 || 0 || ½ || ½ || 1 || ½ || 1 || ½ || 1 || 1 || 8½ || 2799 || 2
|-
| 3 || align="left" | || 2742 || ½ || 1 ||  || ½ || ½ || ½ || ½ || 1 || ½ || ½ || ½ || 1 || ½ || ½ || 8 || 2770 || 3–4
|-
| 4 || align="left" | || 2742 || ½ || 0 || ½ ||  || ½ || ½ || ½ || ½ || 1 || 1 || ½ || ½ || 1 || 1 || 8 || 2770 || 3–4
|-
| 5 || align="left" | || 2688 || 1 || 0 || ½ || ½ ||  || ½ || ½ || ½ || ½ || ½ || ½ || ½ || 1 || 1 || 7½ || 2745 || 5
|-
| 6 || align="left" | || 2713 || 0 || 1 || ½ || ½ || ½ ||  || ½ || ½ || ½ || ½ || ½ || ½ || ½ || 1 || 7 || 2715 || 6
|-
| 7 || align="left" | || 2683 || 0 || ½ || ½ || ½ || ½ || ½ ||  || ½ || 1 || ½ || ½ || ½ || 0 || ½ || 6 || 2659 || 7–11
|-
| 8 || align="left" | || 2703 || ½ || ½ || 0 || ½ || ½ || ½ || ½ ||  || 0 || 1 || 0 || 1 || ½ || ½ || 6 || 2657 || 7–11
|-
| 9 || align="left" | || 2659 || ½ || 0 || ½ || 0 || ½ || ½ || 0 || 1 ||  || ½ || ½ || 1 || ½ || ½ || 6 || 2661 || 7–11
|-
| 10 || align="left" | || 2687 || 0 || ½ || ½ || 0 || ½ || ½ || ½ || 0 || ½ ||  || 1 || ½ || 1 || ½ || 6 || 2659 || 7–11
|-
| 11 || align="left" | || 2605 || 0 || 0 || ½ || ½ || ½ || ½ || ½ || 1 || ½ || 0 ||  || ½ || ½ || 1 || 6 || 2665 || 7–11
|- 
| 12 || align="left" | || 2641 || ½ || ½ || 0 || ½ || ½ || ½ || ½ || 0 || 0 || ½ || ½ ||  || 1 || ½ || 5½ || 2634 || 12
|-
| 13 || align="left" | || 2695 || 0 || 0 || ½ || 0 || 0 || ½ || 1 || ½ || ½ || 0 || ½ || 0 ||  || 1 || 4½ || 2577 || 13
|-
| 14 || align="left" | || 2697 || 0 || 0 || ½ || 0 || 0 || 0 || ½ || ½ || ½ || ½ || 0 || ½ || 0 ||  || 3 || 2476 || 14 
|}

{| class="wikitable" style="text-align: center;"
|+ 64th Corus Chess Tournament, group B, January 2002, Wijk aan Zee, Cat. XII (2530)
! !! Player !! Rating !! 1 !! 2 !! 3 !! 4 !! 5 !! 6 !! 7 !! 8 !! 9 !! 10 !! 11 !! 12 !! Total !! TPR !! Place
|-
| 1 || align=left| || 2632 ||  || ½ || ½ || ½ || ½ || ½ || 1 || ½ || 1 || 1 || 1 || 1 || 8 || 2695 || 1
|-
| 2 || align="left" | || 2574 || ½ ||  || ½ || ½ || ½ || 1 || ½ || 1 || ½ || 0 || 1 || 1 || 7 || 2628 || 2–3
|-
| 3 || align="left" | || 2659 || ½ || ½ ||  || 0 || ½ || ½ || ½ || ½ || 1 || 1 || 1 || 1 || 7 || 2620 || 2–3
|-
| 4 || align="left" | || 2626 || ½ || ½ || 1 ||  || 1 || 0 || 0 || 0 || 1 || 1 || ½ || 1 || 6½ || 2586 || 4
|-
| 5 || align="left" | || 2501 || ½ || ½ || ½ || 0 ||  || 1 || ½ || ½ || ½ || 1 || ½ || ½ || 6 || 2568 || 5–6
|-
| 6 || align="left" | || 2498 || ½ || 0 || ½ || 1 || 0 ||  || ½ || ½ || ½ || 1 || ½ || 1 || 6 || 2568 || 5–6
|-
| 7 || align="left" | || 2451 || 0 || ½ || ½ || 1 || ½ || ½ ||  || 1 || 0 || ½ || ½ || ½ || 5½ || 2537 || 7–8
|-
| 8 || align="left" | || 2522 || ½ || 0 || ½ || 1 || ½ || ½ || 0 ||  || 1 || ½ || ½ || ½ || 5½ || 2530 || 7–8
|-
| 9 || align="left" | || 2458 || 0 || ½ || 0 || 0 || ½ || ½ || 1 || 0 ||  || ½ || 1 || 0 || 4 || 2434 || 9–10
|-
| 10 || align="left" | || 2460 || 0 || 1 || 0 || 0 || 0 || 0 || ½ || ½ || ½ ||  || 1 || ½ || 4 || 2434 || 9–10
|-
| 11 || align="left" | || 2498 || 0 || 0 || 0 || ½ || ½ || ½ || ½ || ½ || 0 || 0 ||  || 1 || 3½ || 2399 || 11
|- 
| 12 || align="left" | || 2481 || 0 || 0 || 0 || 0 || ½ || 0 || ½ || ½ || 1 || ½ || 0 ||  || 3 || 2359 || 12
|}

{| class="wikitable" style="text-align: center;"
|+ 64th Corus Chess Tournament, group C, 18–27 January 2002, Wijk aan Zee, Cat. VIII (2447)
! !! Player !! Rating !! 1 !! 2 !! 3 !! 4 !! 5 !! 6 !! 7 !! 8 !! 9 !! 10 !! Total !! TPR !! Place
|-
| 1 || align=left| || 2555 ||  || ½ || ½ || 1 || 1 || ½ || ½ || ½ || 1 || 1 || 6½ || 2601 || 1–2
|-
| 2 || align="left" | || 2605 || ½ ||  || ½ || 1 || ½ || ½ || ½ || 1 || 1 || 1 || 6½ || 2595 || 1–2
|-
| 3 || align="left" | || 2558 || ½ || ½ ||  || ½ || 1 || 1 || ½ || ½ || 1 || ½ || 6 || 2559 || 3
|-
| 4 || align="left" | || 2410 || 0 || 0 || ½ ||  || ½ || ½ || 1 || 1 || 1 || 1 || 5½ || 2531 || 4
|-
| 5 || align="left" | || 2461 || 0 || ½ || 0 || ½ ||  || 0 || 1 || 1 || 1 || 1 || 5 || 2488 || 5
|-
| 6 || align="left" | || 2384 || ½ || ½ || 0 || ½ || 1 ||  || ½ || 0 || 1 || ½ || 4½ || 2454 || 6–7
|-
| 7 || align="left" | || 2327 || ½ || ½ || ½ || 0 || 0 || ½ ||  || 1 || 1 || ½ || 4½ || 2460 || 6–7
|-
| 8 || align="left" | || 2377 || ½ || 0 || ½ || 0 || 0 || 1 || 0 ||  || 0 || 1 || 3 || 2329 || 8
|-
| 9 || align="left" | || 2362 || 0 || 0 || 0 || 0 || 0 || 0 || 0 || 1 ||  || 1 || 2 || 2236 || 9
|-
| 10 || align="left" | || 2432 || 0 || 0 || ½ || 0 || 0 || ½ || ½ || 0 || 0 ||  || 1½ || 2175 || 10
|}

References

Tata Steel Chess Tournament
2002 in chess
2002 in Dutch sport